Sabina Tashkenbaeva (born 27 November 2000 in Tashkent, Uzbekistan) is an Uzbekistani rhythmic gymnast. She is the 2019 Asian Championships all-around gold medalist.

Career 
Tashkenbaeva began training in gymnastics in 2006. She became a member of Uzbekistan's national team in 2013 and made her international senior debut in 2016.

Tashkenbaeva competed at the 2017 Islamic Solidarity Games, earning silver in the team event alongside compatriots Anastasiya Serdyukova and Nurinisso Usmanova, as well as bronze in both the clubs and ribbon individual competition. She won the silver medal in both the individual all-around and team events at the 2018 Asian Games held in Jakarta, Indonesia.

At the 2019 Asian Rhythmic Gymnastics Championships held in Pattaya, Thailand she won the gold medal in the individual all-around and team all-around events.

Through the 2021 FIG World Cup Series, Tashkenbaeva qualified for an Olympic berth. She was the second-highest ranked eligible gymnast, after Slovenia's Ekaterina Vedeneeva.

Personal life 
Tashkenbaeva speaks English, Russian and Uzbek. She attends the Uzbek State University of Physical Education.

References

External links 
 

Living people
2000 births
Place of birth missing (living people)
Uzbekistani rhythmic gymnasts
Gymnasts at the 2018 Asian Games
Medalists at the 2018 Asian Games
Asian Games silver medalists for Uzbekistan
Asian Games medalists in gymnastics
Islamic Solidarity Games competitors for Uzbekistan
21st-century Uzbekistani women